NWH may refer to:

 Newton-Wellesley Hospital, a community teaching medical center in Newton, Massachusetts, U.S.
 Northern Westchester Hospital, a medical center in Mount Kisco, New York, U.S.

See also
 No Way Home (disambiguation)
 Spider-Man: No Way Home, a 2021 American superhero film in the Marvel Cinematic Universe